In high-energy physics, a pseudoscalar meson is a meson with total spin 0 and odd parity (usually notated as 
Pseudoscalar mesons are commonly seen in proton-proton scattering and proton-antiproton annihilation, and include the pion, kaon, eta, and eta prime particles, whose masses are known with great precision.

Among all of the mesons known to exist, in some sense, the pseudoscalars are the most well studied and understood.

History 
The pion was first proposed to exist by Yukawa in the 1930s as the primary force carrying boson of the Yukawa potential in nuclear interactions, and was later observed at nearly the same mass that he originally predicted for it. In the 1950s and 1960s, the pseudoscalar mesons began to proliferate, and were eventually organized into a multiplet according to Murray Gell-Mann's so-called "Eightfold Way".

Gell-Mann further predicted the existence of a ninth resonance in the pseudoscalar multiplet, which he originally called . Indeed, this particle was later found and is now known as the eta prime meson. The structure of the pseudoscalar meson multiplet, and also the ground state baryon multiplets, led Gell-Mann (and Zweig, independently) to create the well known quark model.

The  puzzle 
Despite the pseudoscalar mesons' masses being known to high precision, and being the most well studied and understood mesons, the decay properties of the pseudoscalar mesons, particularly of eta and eta-prime, are somewhat contradictory to their mass hierarchy:
While the  meson is much more massive than the  meson, the  meson is thought to contain a larger component of the relatively heavy strange and anti-strange quarks, than the η′ meson does, which appears contradictory. This failure of the quark model to explain this mass difference is called the " puzzle".

The presence of an (1405) state also brings glueball mixing into the discussion. This is one of a few ways in which the unexpectedly large  mass of 957.78 MeV/c2 can be explained, relative to its model-predicted mass around 250–300 MeV/c2.

List of pseudoscalar mesons 
{|
|- style="vertical-align:bottom;"
! Meson nonet
|        
! Mesons with heavy quarks
|        
! Hypothetical mesons
|- style="vertical-align:top;"
| pion (×3)  meson (×1)  meson (×1) Kaon (×4)
|
| D meson B meson  meson  meson
|
|  meson
|}

See also 
List of mesons
Vector meson
Pseudovector meson
Pseudoscalar boson

Footnotes

References 

Mesons
Bosons
Subatomic particles with spin 0